Wetzstein may refer to:

Mountains in Germany
Wetzstein (Hesse), in north-central Hesse
Wetzstein (Thuringia), in southern Thuringia

People with the surname
Johann Gottfried Wetzstein (1815–1905), Orientalist and Prussian diplomat